The People's Movement for Justice and Welfare is a Danish political movement, founded December 21, 2006 by former leading members of the Danish Progress Party.

The movement is working for the constitutional rights of the Danish people, the strengthening of the individual's opportunities for development, and for the security of society and the individual Dane.

The movement publishes the magazine dagens Danmark (lit. Denmark Today).

Leaders
 Kristian Poul Herkild, 21 December 2006 - 2014

Notes

External links
 Website for the People's Movement for Justice and Welfare 

Political movements
Political parties in Denmark
2006 establishments in Denmark
Political parties established in 2006